Dinah Pfizenmaier was the defending champion, but lost in the semifinals to Kateryna Kozlova.

Kozlova went on to win the tournament, defeating Richèl Hogenkamp in the final, 6–4, 6–7(3–7), 6–1.

Seeds

Main draw

Finals

Top half

Bottom half

References 
 Main draw

Reinert Open - Singles
Reinert Open